Kim Kyoung-eun (born 8 August 1998) is a South Korean freestyle skier. She competed in the 2018 Winter Olympics.

References

1998 births
Living people
Freestyle skiers at the 2018 Winter Olympics
South Korean female freestyle skiers
Olympic freestyle skiers of South Korea